Jaroszówka may refer to the following places in Poland:
Jaroszówka, a district of the city of Białystok (NE Poland)
Jaroszówka, Lower Silesian Voivodeship (south-west Poland)
Jaroszówka, Łódź Voivodeship (central Poland)
Jaroszówka, Lesser Poland Voivodeship (south Poland)